Michael G. "Mike" Mahovlich (born August 27, 1960 in Burnaby, British Columbia) is a retired male javelin thrower from Canada, who won a total number of two national titles (1988 and 1989) during his career. He competed at the 1987 World Championships and the 1988 Summer Olympics, but did not reach the final. Mahovlich set his personal best on April 26, 1986 throwing 79.04 metres.

Achievements

References
 
 Profile

External links
 
 
 
 
 

1960 births
Athletes (track and field) at the 1986 Commonwealth Games
Athletes (track and field) at the 1987 Pan American Games
Athletes (track and field) at the 1988 Summer Olympics
Athletes (track and field) at the 1990 Commonwealth Games
Sportspeople from British Columbia
Canadian male javelin throwers
Living people
Commonwealth Games competitors for Canada
Olympic track and field athletes of Canada
World Athletics Championships athletes for Canada
Sportspeople from Burnaby
Pan American Games track and field athletes for Canada
20th-century Canadian people
21st-century Canadian people